Mūtiba (Sanskrit: , , and ; Latin ) was an ancient tribe of south-central South Asia whose existence is attested during the Iron Age.

Location
The precise location Mūtibas is yet uncertain.

The name , by which the  calls the Mūtibas, might be connected to the name of the Musi river.

History
The Mūtibas already existed as a tribe during the time of the s.

References

Further reading

Ancient peoples of India